New Bight Airport  is an airport in New Bight on Cat Island in The Bahamas.

Facilities

Airlines and destinations

See also
 Arthur's Town Airport  in Arthur's Town on Cat Island

References

External links
 

Airports in the Bahamas
Cat Island, Bahamas